Christian Borgs is a German-American computer scientist and mathematical physicist.

Biography
He is a professor in the Department of Electrical Engineering and Computer Sciences at the University of California, Berkeley. Previously, he was the deputy managing director of Microsoft Research New England in Cambridge, Massachusetts, which he co-founded in 2008.
Borgs' research includes developing the theory of graphons, computational analyses of the folk theorem (game theory), the planted clique, and the partition problem. For prior work on phase transitions, he was awarded the Karl Scheel Prize.

Borgs is a fellow of the American Mathematical Society and of the  American Association for the Advancement of Science.

References 

Year of birth missing (living people)
Living people
Fellows of the American Association for the Advancement of Science
Fellows of the American Mathematical Society
Ludwig Maximilian University of Munich alumni
Academic staff of the Free University of Berlin
Academic staff of Leipzig University
Microsoft Research people
University of California, Berkeley faculty